Melaleuca scalena is a plant in the myrtle family, Myrtaceae and is endemic to the south west of Western Australia. Plants of this species were previously included in Melaleuca uncinata or broombush until a review of that species in 2004. Its leaves are narrow cylinders, the flowers in small yellow heads and the fruits tightly packed together in oval clusters. This species is very similar to Melaleuca hamata but the plants have a comparatively scruffy or less strong and healthy appearance.

Description

The flowers are pale yellow and arranged in heads containing 5 to 14 groups of flowers in threes. There are five bundles of stamens around the flower, each with 3 to 9 stamens.

Taxonomy and naming
The specific epithet (scalena) is from the Latin word meaning "unequal" referring to the impoverished appearance of this species compared to Melaleuca hamata.

Distribution and habitat
This melaleuca occurs in and between the Wyalkatchem, Mount Walker, Woodanilling and Dumbleyung districts in the Avon Wheatbelt, Coolgardie, Esperance Plains, Jarrah Forest, Mallee and Yalgoo biogeographic regions. It grows in gravel, sand or loam on flats and drainage lines near salt lakes.

Conservation
Melaleuca scalena is listed as "not threatened" by the Government of Western Australia Department of Parks and Wildlife.

References

sapientes
Myrtales of Australia
Plants described in 2004
Rosids of Western Australia
Endemic flora of Western Australia
Taxa named by Lyndley Craven